The Cherry Orchard is a 1973 Australian TV adaptation of the 1904 play by Anton Chekhov.

References

External links

Australian television films
Films based on plays by Anton Chekhov
1970s English-language films
1973 films
1973 television films
1970s Australian films